Christian Leye (born 6 April 1981) is a German politician from DIE LINKE. He is a Member of the German Bundestag for North Rhine-Westphalia.

Career 
Born in Bochum, Leye has been the state chairman of DIE LINKE in North Rhine-Westphalia since 2016. He contested Duisburg II at the 2021 federal election. He won a seat on the party list.

References 

Living people
1981 births
21st-century German politicians
Members of the Bundestag for North Rhine-Westphalia
Members of the Bundestag for The Left
University of Göttingen alumni
Members of the Bundestag 2021–2025

People from Bochum